The James W. Martin School of Public Policy and Administration (the Martin School) is the graduate school of Public Affairs at the University of Kentucky.

Located in Lexington, Kentucky, the Martin School prepares students for leadership in public service. The Martin School offers graduate degrees in public administration and public policy. U.S. News & World Report presently ranks the Martin School 2nd in Public Finance and Budgeting among public affairs programs and the National Research Council ranks the Ph.D. program between 4th and 11th overall.

History
The Martin School is named for James W. Martin, public servant and distinguished scholar of government finance and economics. Originally named the James W. Martin Center, the school admitted its first class in 1976. The name was changed to the James W. Martin School of Public Administration in 1984. In 1985, the school was designated a "Center of Excellence" by the University of Kentucky. The name was officially changed in 1994 to the James W. Martin School of Public Policy and Administration to better reflect the scope of the school's academic and public service pursuits.

Academics
Students may choose from a variety of degree programs and tailor their experience by selecting an area of concentration, completing a 400-hour internship or practicum and presenting a self-directed capstone project. Traditional Master's programs are two-year degrees and may be completed on a full or part-time basis. Beginning in the summer of 2013, one-year intensive MPA/MPP programs will also be offered. The National Association of Schools of Public Affairs and Administration accredits the Master's of Public Administration. The U.S. News & World Report Rankings ranked the Martin School 2nd in the area of Public Budgeting and Finance, and 16th among Public Universities in America.

Graduate degree programs
 MPA - Master of Public Administration 
 MPP - Master of Public Policy
 PhD - Doctor of Philosophy in Public Administration
 
Graduate certificate programs
 Global Health
 Transportation
 Environmental Systems

Concentrations
There currently are ten areas of concentration available to students. These are:

 Economic Development
 Education Policy
 Environmental Policy
 Gerontology
 Health Policy
 International Policy and Management
 Non-Profit Management
 Policy Analysis
 Transportation Systems Management

Dual and joint degree programs
The Martin School offers dual and joint degrees with the College of Law (JD/MPA), College of Pharmacy (Pharm.D/MPA) and the College of Engineering (MPA/BS Engineering). The Pharm.D/MPA dual degree is the only program of its kind offered in the United States.

Accelerated degree program

The University Scholars Program allows students from the University of Kentucky, Georgetown College and Morehead State University to complete their bachelor's and master's degrees in five years.

References

External links
 
 U.S. News Guide to Public Affairs Programs
 Institute for Federalism & Intergovernmental Relations
 UK Center for Poverty Research
 UK Center for Nonprofit Leadership
 National Association of Schools of Public Affairs and Administration

Public administration schools in the United States
Public policy schools
University of Kentucky
1976 establishments in Kentucky